Leopold Andreas Ignaz Sonnleithner (from 1828 Leopold Edler von Sonnleithner; born 15 November 1797 in Wien; died 3 March 1873 in Vienna) was an Austrian lawyer and a well-known personality of the Viennese Classical music scene.  He was a friend and patron of Ludwig van Beethoven, Franz Schubert, Franz Grillparzer, and Carl Czerny.

Family 
Leopold von Sonnleithner was a grandson of the composer Christoph Sonnleithner, and son of the lawyer Ignaz von Sonnleithner. Leopold married  Louise Augusta Gosmar (11 August 1803 – 7 June 1850), a native of Hamburg, on 6 May 1828.

Life 
Sonnleithner received his doctorate of law on 4 May 1819 in Vienna.
He was a personal friend and patron of the Viennese composers Ludwig van Beethoven, Franz Schubert and his cousins, the playwright Franz Grillparzer (1791–1872), and Carl Czerny. Schubert dedicated his musical setting of Grillparzer's Serenade "Hesitantly Quiet" (D921) to Sonnleithner's wife Louise. Sonnleithner handled Carl Czerny's will.

Sonnleithner was buried at a cemetery in the Viennese district of Margareten in 1873.

References 

Über Mozart's Opern aus seiner früheren Jugend. In: Cäcilia. Heft 94/1845 und Heft 98/1846, Verlag Schott, Mainz 1845/1846

External links
Literaturliste im Online-Katalog der Staatsbibliothek zu Berlin

Lawyers from Vienna
Edlers of Austria
1797 births
1873 deaths